Tigerfish can refer to fish from various families, and derives from official and colloquial associations of these with the tiger (Panthera tigris). However, the primary species designated by the name "tigerfish" are African and belong to the family Alestidae.

African tigerfish 

Several species belonging to the genus Hydrocynus of the family Alestidae are referred to as "tigerfish", and are particularly prized as game fish. These African fish are found in many rivers and lakes on the continent and are fierce predators with distinctive, proportionally large teeth.

The goliath tigerfish (Hydrocynus goliath) is among the most famous tigerfish. It is found in the Congo River system and Lake Tanganyika and is the largest member of the family Alestidae. Another famous species, simply called the tigerfish (Hydrocynus vittatus), is commonly found in the southernly Okavango Delta, and the Zambezi River, and also in the two biggest lakes along the Zambezi, Lake Kariba which borders Zimbabwe and Zambia, Kabombo River in Zambia and Cabora Bassa in Mozambique, and finally in the Jozini dam in South Africa. Both the goliath tigerfish and its smaller relative the tigerfish are found in Africa.

Behavior
In the western gamefishing world, Hydrocynus vittatus is considered Africa's equivalent of the South American piranha, though it belongs to a completely different zoological family. Like the piranha, individual tigerfish have interlocking, razor-sharp teeth, along with streamlined, muscular bodies, and are extremely aggressive and capable predators who often hunt in groups. The African tigerfish has been recorded to attack and catch birds in flight.

Cichlids
The name "tigerfish" has occasionally been used for a species of cichlid in the genus Rhamphochromis. The species is large, silver-coloured, and individuals typically have one or more black lines running the length of either flank. These fish are native to Lake Malawi in Africa.  Like the other African tigerfish species, they are famed for possessing large, prominent teeth, and they are known to attack humans.

Datnioididae
Several species of Coius (or Datnioides, depending on the taxonomic authority) have been referred to as "tigerfish", particularly in fishkeeping books and magazines. They are large, wide-bodied fish whose flanks are covered by vivid black stripes.

Erythrinidae
The large South American characins of the family Erythrinidae have also sometimes been called "tigerfish".

See also
Tiger shark

References

 Tiger fish – Guide to the Tiger fish (Hydrocynus forskalii)

External links
Discovery Channel's River Monsters
Fishbase list of species commonly called "tigerfish"
Fishbase list of species commonly called "tiger fish"

Fish common names

th:ปลาเสือ